Lorandersonia baileyi (Bailey's rabbitbrush), is a North American species of flowering plants in the tribe Astereae within the family Asteraceae. It was initially discovered in the Guadalupe Mountains of New Mexico in 1902, and has since been collected in Arizona, Utah, Colorado, Kansas, Oklahoma, Texas, Chihuahua, Coahuila, and Nuevo León.

Lorandersonia baileyi is a branching shrub up to 70 cm (28 inches) tall. It has many small yellow flower heads, each with about 5 disc florets but no ray florets.

See also
Vernon Orlando Bailey

References

External links
Photo of herbarium specimen collected in Nuevo León

Astereae
Flora of the Southwestern United States
Flora of Mexico
Plants described in 1913